The Dragon, also known as Loong, is the fifth of the 12-year cycle of animals which appear in the Chinese zodiac related to the Chinese calendar. The Year of the Dragon is associated with the Earthly Branch symbol 辰, pronounced chen.

It has been proposed by one academic researcher that the Earthly Branch character may have been associated with scorpions; it may have symbolized the star Antares. In the Buddhist calendar used in Thailand, Cambodia, Laos, Myanmar, and Sri Lanka, the Dragon is replaced by the nāga. In the Gurung zodiac, the Dragon is replaced by the eagle. In Old Turkic calendar it is replaced by the fish or crocodile. Early Persian translations of the medieval period change the dragon to a sea serpent although in current times it is generally referred to as whale.

During the Cultural Revolution, giant panda was situated in the place of the dragon although this didn't last long.

Years and the Five Elements
People born within these date ranges can be said to have been born in the "Year of the Dragon", while bearing the following elemental sign:

There are typically marked spikes in the birth rates of countries that use the Chinese zodiac or places with substantial Overseas Chinese populations during the year of the Dragon, because such "Dragon babies" are considered to be lucky and have desirable characteristics that supposedly lead to better life outcomes. The relatively recent phenomenon of planning a child's birth in the Dragon year has led to hospital undercapacity issues and even an uptick in infant mortality rates toward the end of these years due to strained neonatal resources.

Compatibility

Cycle: (Trine Group) Dragon needs Monkey, Monkey needs Rat, Rat needs Dragon, (Opposite Sign) his rivalry needs to oppose the Dog.

Basic astrology elements

References

External links

Chinese astrological signs
Vietnamese astrological signs
Chinese dragons
Dragons